Parasediminibacterium is a Gram-negative, strictly aerobic, rod-shaped and non-motile genus of bacteria from the family of Chitinophagaceae with one known species (Parasediminibacterium paludis). Parasediminibacterium paludis has been isolated from wetland from the Jeju Island in Korea.

References

Chitinophagia
Bacteria genera
Monotypic bacteria genera
Taxa described in 2016